Omar al-Mukhṭār Muḥammad bin Farḥāṭ al-Manifī (20 August 1858 – 16 September 1931), called The Lion of the Desert, known among the colonial Italians as Matari of the Mnifa, was the leader of native resistance in Cyrenaica (currently Eastern Libya) under the Senussids, against the Italian colonization of Libya. A teacher-turned-general, Omar was also a prominent figure of the Senussi movement, and he is considered the national hero of Libya and a symbol of resistance in the Arab and Islamic worlds. Beginning in 1911, he organised and, for nearly twenty years, led the Libyan resistance movement against the Italian colonial empire during the First and Second Italo-Senussi Wars. After many attempts, the Italian Armed Forces managed to capture Al-Mukhtar near Slonta and hanged him in 1931 after he refused to surrender.

Early life
Omar Al-Mukhtar was born in 1858 to a family in the town of Zanzur near Tobruk, in the region of Ottoman  Cyrenaica to an Arab tribe, belonging to the Senussi (who were seen as Libyan Ashrafs clan just like Emir or King Idris es Senussi), before eventually becoming chief or leader of the clan. As a child, Omar lost his father early on and spent his youth in poverty. He was adopted by a sheikh, and was friends with the nephew of Hussein Ghariani, Sharif al Geriani. His uncle was a political-religious leader in Cyrenaica, and received his early education at the local mosque, before continuing his studying for eight years at the Senussi university in Jaghbub, the holy city of the Senussi Tariqa. He became a popular expert on the Quran and an imam, joining the confraternity of the Senussi. He also came to be well informed of the social structure of his society, as he was chosen to settle intertribal disputes.

Mukhtar developed a strong relationship with the Senussid Movement during his years in Jaghbub and in 1895, Al-Mahdi Senoussi traveled with him south to Kufra, and on another occasion further south to Karo in Chad, where he was appointed as sheikh of Zawiyat Ayn Kalk. When the French Empire encroached on Chad in 1899, he was sent among other Senussites to help defend Chad from the French, as the Senussi considered their expansion dangerous due to their missionary activities in Central and West Africa. In 1902, Omar was recalled north after the death of Al-Mahdi, the new Senussi leader Ahmed Sharif as-Senussi appointed him as Sheikh of the troubled Zawiyat Laqsur in Northern Cyrenaica.

Italian invasion 

In October 1911, during the Italo-Turkish War, the Regia Marina (Italian Royal Navy) under the command of Admiral Luigi Faravelli reached the shores of Libya, then a territory subject to Ottoman control. The admiral demanded that the Ottoman administration and garrison surrender their territory to the Italians or incur the immediate destruction of the city of Tripoli and Benghazi. The Ottomans and their Libyan allies withdrew to the countryside instead of surrendering, and the Italians bombarded the cities for three days, and then proclaimed the Tripolitanians to be 'committed and strongly bound to Italy'. This marked the beginning of a series of battles between the Italian colonial forces and the Libyan armed opposition in Cyrenaica.

Guerrilla warfare 

A teacher of the Qur'an by profession, Mukhtar was also skilled in the strategies and tactics of desert warfare. He knew local geography well and used that knowledge to advantage in battles against the Italians, who were unaccustomed to desert warfare. Mukhtar repeatedly led his small, highly alert groups in successful attacks against the Italians, after which they would fade back into the desert terrain. Mukhtar’s men skilfully attacked outposts, ambushed troops, and cut lines of supply and communication. The Regio Esercito (Italian Royal Army) was left astonished and embarrassed by his guerrilla tactics.

In the mountainous region of Jebel Akhdar ("Green Mountain") in 1924, Italian governor Ernesto Bombelli created a counter-guerrilla force that inflicted a severe setback to guerilla forces in April 1925.  Mukhtar then quickly modified his own tactics and was able to count on continued help from Egypt. In March 1927, despite the occupation of Giarabub from February 1926 and increasingly stringent rule under Governor Attilio Teruzzi, Mukhtar surprised Italian troops at Raheiba. Between 1927 and 1928, Mukhtar reorganised the Senusite forces, who were being hunted constantly by the Italians. Even General Teruzzi recognized Omar's qualities of "exceptional perseverance and strong willpower."
Marshal Pietro Badoglio, Governor of Libya from January 1929, after extensive negotiations, concluded a compromise with Mukhtar (described by the Italians as his complete submission) similar to previous Italo-Senusite accords.  At the end of October 1929, Mukhtar denounced the compromise and re-established a unity of action among Libyan forces, preparing himself for the ultimate confrontation with General Rodolfo Graziani, the Italian military commander from March 1930. A massive offensive in June against Mukhtar's forces having failed, Graziani, in full accord with Badoglio, Emilio De Bono (Minister of the Colonies), and Benito Mussolini, initiated a plan to break the Libyan Mujāhideen:100,000 population of Jebel Akhdar would be relocated to concentration camps on the coast, and the Libyan-Egyptian border from the coast at Giarabub would be fence-closed, preventing any foreign help to the fighters and depriving them of support from the native population. These measures, which Graziani initiated early in 1931, took their toll on the Senusite resistance. The rebels were deprived of help and reinforcements, spied upon, hit by Italian aircraft, and pursued on the ground by the Italian forces aided by local informers and collaborators. Mukhtar continued to struggle despite increased hardships and risks, but on 11 September 1931, he was ambushed near Slonta. 

Mukhtar's final adversary, Italian General Rodolfo Graziani, has given a description of the Senusite leader that is not lacking in respect: "Of medium height, stout, with white hair, beard, and mustache. Omar was endowed with a quick and lively intelligence; was knowledgeable in religious matters, and revealed an energetic and impetuous character, unselfish and uncompromising; ultimately, he remained very religious and poor, even though he had been one of the most important Senusist figures."

Capture and execution 

Mukhtar's struggle of nearly twenty years came to an end on 11 September 1931, when he was wounded in battle near Slonta, and then captured by the Italian Army. On 16 September 1931, on the orders of the Italian court and with Italian hopes that Libyan resistance would die with him, Mukhtar was hanged before his followers in the Suluq prisoner of war camp at the age of 73 years old.

Legacy

Omar Al-Mukhtar University was founded in 1961.
 Since 1971, Mukhtar's face has appeared on the Libyan ten-dinar note.
 His final years were depicted in the movie Lion of the Desert (1981), starring Anthony Quinn, Oliver Reed, and Irene Papas. It was based on the struggles of Mukhtar against Rodolfo Graziani's forces. 
 A statement by the man used in the movie captured the tongues and ears of millions of Muslims, . ..''We are people that will not surrender, we win or we die.''
 In 2009, Libyan leader Muammar Gaddafi wore a photograph of Mukhtar in Italian captivity on his chest while on a state visit to Rome, and brought along Mukhtar's elderly son during the visit.
 With the Libyan Civil War beginning 17 February 2011, Omar Mukhtar again became a symbol for a united, free Libya and his picture was depicted on various flags and posters of the anti-Gaddafist forces. Rebel militias named one of their brigades the "Omar Mukhtar brigade" after him.
 A school is named after Mukhtar in Irbid, Jordan
 A masjid is named after Mukhtar in Tampa, Florida, USA, known as Masjid Omar Al Mokhtar.
Streets are named after Mukhtar in:
Kuwait City, Kuwait (Omar Al-Mukhtar street)
Gaza City (Omar Mukhtar Street)
Cairo, Egypt (Omar Al Mukhtar Street)
West Bay area of Doha, Qatar (Omar Al Mukhtar Street)
Bizerte, Tunisia
Riyadh, Saudi Arabia (Omar Al Mukhtar Road)
Irbid, Jordan
 Tangier, Morocco (Avenue Omar Mokhtar)

Gallery

See also 
 Omar the North African lion
 Senussi
 We Will Not Surrender (We Win or We Die), protest song during the 2011 Libyan Civil War based on one of Mukhtar's speech.

References

External links 

 Italian occupation and resistance
 Secret proceedings in the Benghazi trial
 Why Libya Commemorates the 'Black Day'
 Libyan lion
 

1858 births
1931 deaths
Executed revolutionaries
Guerrilla warfare theorists
Italian Libya
Libyan educators
Libyan rebels
Libyan resistance leaders
Libyan revolutionaries
Libyan Sunni Muslims
Executed Libyan people
People executed by Italy by hanging
Italy–Libya relations
Libyan independence activists
Anti-fascists